Bohuslav (or Boslov) is a city on the Ros River in Obukhiv Raion, Kyiv Oblast (province) of Ukraine. Population: . It hosts the administration of Bohuslav urban hromada, one of the hromadas of Ukraine. The population in 2001 was 17,135.

It is known as Boslov by some of its Yiddish speaking residents and Boguslav (by the Russophones).

History
The city's year of establishment and source of name is uncertain. It is mentioned by Hypatian Codex as earlier as 1032 which is assumed as the year of establishment. In official documents it is mentioned as earlier as 1195 when Bohuslavl was handed over by the Grand Prince of Kyiv Rurik II to the Grand Prince of Vladimir-Suzdal Vsevolod III who preceded him on Kyivan throne several years earlier.

In 1240 Bohuslav was destroyed by the Mongol invasion. In 1362 it was liberated by forces of the Grand Duchy of Lithuania, Ruthenia, and Samogitia. In 1569 Bohuslav was passed to the Polish Crown and in 1620 it received its Magdeburg rights and its city banner. Since 1591 Bohuslav belonged to Janusz Ostrogski, the voivode of Volhynia. From 1648 to 1667 it was part of the Cossack Hetmanate and after the Treaty of Andrusovo was once again returned to Poland. In 1685 it was occupied by Samiylo Samus whom Ivan Mazepa appointed the appointed Hetman of Right-bank Ukraine when Poland allowed to restore cossacks' liberties.

Since that time and until 1704 Bohuslav became a residence of the appointed Hetman. In 1704 Samus surrendered his authority to Mazepa. After withdrawal of the Russian armed forces in 1708 from Poland, Samus continued to self-govern unlawfully in the region. In 1711 he joined forces with Pylyp Orlyk, however after number of unsuccessful storms of Bila Tserkva, Orlyk withdrew to Moldova. Samus was left to defend Bohuslav on his own now against the united armies of Russia and Poland (bound by the Treaty of Narva). In 1712 Samus was arrested and exiled to Siberia. Bohuslav regiment was liquidated and the city was returned once again under the Polish administration.

After the first partition of Poland the city was passed to the Russian Empire and until 1837 it was a center of Bohuslav county. The county was restored once again after the establishment of the Soviet regime in 1919 and 1923 it was transformed into the Bohuslav Raion.

It had a large Jewish community. According to the 1897 census, on a total of 11,372 inhabitants, 7445 people were Jews whose community was destroyed in the Holocaust.

Until 18 July 2020, Bohuslav was the administrative center of Bohuslav Raion. The raion was abolished that day as part of the administrative reform of Ukraine, which reduced the number of raions of Kyiv Oblast to seven. The area of Bohuslav Raion was split between Bila Tserkva and Obukhiv Raions, with Bohuslav being transferred to Obukhiv Raion.

Landmarks
 Former heder locally known as "kamianytsia" built in 1726 is the oldest building in the city. During the Soviet times it was transformed into a club for deaf and mute at first and after World War II into the museum of Komsomol Glory. Today it is a museum of decorative art.

Prominent personalities
 Neonila Lahodiuk, Ukrainian jazz composer, a pianist and a music teacher, Merited Artist of Ukraine
 Ivan Soshenko, Ukrainian painter, contemporary and close friend of Taras Shevchenko
 Hélène Sparrow, Polish medical doctor and bacteriologist
 Herman Toll, United States congressman
 Olexandra Tymoshenko, 1992 Olympic champion
 Prominent Americans who trace their family roots to Bohuslav include the late Congressman Herman Toll (1907–1967), who emigrated from the region with his family around 1910, and his nephews Robert (Bob) and Bruce Toll, founders of publicly traded homebuilder Toll Brothers.

Gallery

References

Further reading

External links
 Bohuslav at Encyclopedia of Ukraine
 City's official website 
 

Cities in Kyiv Oblast
Populated places established in the 11th century
1032 establishments in Europe
Cities of district significance in Ukraine
Cossack Hetmanate
Holocaust locations in Ukraine